Turcopalpa glaseri is a moth in the family Gelechiidae. It was described by Povolný in 1973. It is found in Turkey and Ukraine.

The length of the forewings is about 6 mm. The forewings are nearly uniform brown to brownish-grey, with three ill-defined dots. The hindwings are grey, but shading to dirty whitish at the base.

References

Gnorimoschemini
Moths described in 1973